Middle Street station (also known as Kahauiki station) is an under construction Honolulu Rail Transit station in Honolulu, Hawaii. It is part of the third HART segment, scheduled to open in 2031.

The Hawaiian Station Name Working Group proposed Hawaiian names for the twelve rail stations on the eastern end of the rail system (stations in the Airport and City Center segments) in April 2019. The Hawaiian name for this station, "Kahauiki" (or "Hauiki), means "the little hau/hibiscus tree" and refers to an ahupuaʻa bounded by the Kalihi ahupuaʻa (to the east) and the Moanalua ahupuaʻa (to the west).

References

External links
 

Honolulu Rail Transit stations
Railway stations scheduled to open in 2031